Om Namah Shivay is the eighth solo (and tenth overall) studio album by Nina Hagen, released on 29 October 1999. It is a compilation of Hindu bhajans (devotional songs), incorporating mantras and prayers in song form.

Track listing 

 "Shank Invocation, Ganesha Mantra and Om With Digeridoo" – 2:46
 "From Durga Saptashati (700 Names in Praise of Mother Durga)" – 1:59
 "Shri Siddha Siddeshvari Mata Haid Akandeshvariji Aarati!" – 4:43
 "Mrityunjaya Mantra" – 1:41
 "Jai Mata Kali Jai Mata Durge!" – 4:34
 "Hare Krisna Hare Rama!" – 5:31
 "He Shiva Shankara" – 5:46
 "Om Namah Shivay!" – 5:45
 "Gayatri Mantra!" – 1:30
 "Oh Mata Haidhakandeshvari!" – 5:16
 "Sankirtana!" – 7:53
 "Hara Hara Amarnatha Gange" – 6:23
 "Shanti Mantra" – 1:45

Bonus tracks: 1008 Indische Nächte Live
 "Shiva shambu" – 5:51
 "Jay Mata Kali Mata Durge" – 3:28
 "Amba Bhadjan" – 5:33
 "Shiva Shiva Mahadeva" – 4:16
 "Hare Krisna Hare Rama" – 3:51
 "Jay Bajaranga Bali Jay Hanuman" – 5:19
 "He Shiva Shankara" – 3:46
 "Only Love can Save your Life" – 4:47
 "Shiva Bhajan" 6:46
 "Sankirtana" – 6:12
 "Jay Shambu" – 5:15
 "No Poison" – 3:38
 "Bonus Movie" – 4:02

Notes
"Sankirtana" has been previously recorded as "Omhaidakhandi" on Revolution Ballroom
"He Shiva Shankara" has been previously recorded as "Shiva" on BeeHappy

Personnel
Adapted from AllMusic.
 Brigitte Angerhausen – engineer
 Tom Deininger	 – assistant
 Nina Hagen – vocals, producer
 Ingo Krauss –	engineer, mixing

References

1999 albums
Nina Hagen albums